A total lunar eclipse took place on October 27–28, 2004, the second of two total lunar eclipses in 2004, the first being on May 4, 2004.  It was the first lunar eclipse to take place during a World Series game, which when seen from Busch Memorial Stadium in St, Louis, Missouri, provided a surreal sight on the night the Boston Red Sox won their first World Series in 86 years to end the Curse of the Bambino. Occurring 5.6 days before apogee (Apogee on November 2, 2004), the Moon's apparent diameter was smaller. The moon was 10.1 days after perigee and 5.6 days before apogee.

Visibility 

This eclipse was completely visible from all of North and South America, and visible from most of Europe and Africa.

Relation to other lunar eclipses

Eclipse season 

This is the second eclipse this season.

First eclipse this season: 14 October 2004 Partial Solar Eclipse

Eclipses of 2004 

 A partial solar eclipse on April 19.
 A total lunar eclipse on May 4.
 A partial solar eclipse on October 14.
 A total lunar eclipse on October 28.

Lunar year series
It is the third of four lunar year cycles, repeating every 354 days.

Saros series
This eclipse was a part of Saros cycle 136. The next occurrence will be on November 8, 2022. Solar Saros 143 interleaves with this lunar saros with an event occurring every 9 years 5 days alternating between each saros series. The greatest eclipse will occur on April 21, 2293, lasting 101 minutes and 23.5 seconds. The last total lunar eclipse will be on July 7, 2419 and the last partial lunar eclipse on October 3, 2563. The final lunar eclipse of Lunar Saros 136 will be on June 1, 2960.

Metonic series
This eclipse is the third of four Metonic cycle lunar eclipses on the same date, October 28–29, each separated by 19 years:

Half-Saros cycle
A lunar eclipse will be preceded and followed by solar eclipses by 9 years and 5.5 days (a half saros). This lunar eclipse is related to two solar eclipses of Solar Saros 143.

Photo gallery

See also 
List of lunar eclipses and List of 21st-century lunar eclipses
May 2003 lunar eclipse
November 2003 lunar eclipse
May 2004 lunar eclipse

Notes

External links
 NASA
Total Lunar Eclipse of Oct. 27, 2004
 
Saros series 136
 
 
 Lunar Eclipse gallery
 Photo by Wade B Clark Jr. near Lyman, Washington, USA 
 
 Spaceweather.com: Lunar eclipse gallery

2004-10
2004 in science
October 2004 events